The Day of the Imprisoned Writer is an annual, international day intended to recognize and support writers who resist repression of the basic human right to freedom of expression and who stand up to attacks made against their right to impart information.  This day is observed each year on November 15.  It was started in 1981 by PEN International's Writers in Prison Committee.

In addition to increasing the public's awareness of persecuted writers in general, PEN uses the Day of the Imprisoned Writer to direct attention to several specific persecuted or imprisoned writers and their individual circumstances.  Each of the selected writers is from a different part of the world, and each case represents circumstances of repression that occur when governments or other entities in power feel threatened by what writers have written.  On this day, the general public is encouraged to take action—in the form of donations and letters of appeal—on behalf of the selected writers.

The day also serves to commemorate all of the writers killed since the previous year's Day of the Imprisoned Writer.  Between November 15, 2007, and November 15, 2008, at least 39 writers from around the world were killed in circumstances that appeared to be related to their professions.

Highlighted writers from past observances

2013
 Kunchok Tsephel Gopey Tsang; internet writer and website editor, China - Tibet
 Dina Meza; human rights defender and journalist, Honduras
 Zahra Rahnavard; author and political activist, Iran
 Rodney Sieh; newspaper founder, publisher and editor-in-chief, Liberia
 Fazıl Say; writer, composer and musician, Turkey

2012
 Muharrem Erbey; human rights lawyer and writer, Turkey
 Shiva Nazar Ahari; journalist, activist and blogger; Iran
 Ericson Acosta, poet, songwriter and activist, Philippines
 Eskinder Nega; journalist and blogger, Ethiopia
 Regina Martínez; journalist, Mexico

2011
 Abduljalil al-Singace; blogger and human rights defender, Bahrain
 Reeyot Alemu; opposition journalist, Ethiopia
 Nedim Sener and Ahmet Şık; writers in prison, Turkey
 Susana Chavez Castillo; poet and human rights defender, Mexico
 Tashi Rabten (pen-name Te’urang); dissident writer, Tibet

2010
 Robert Mintya; newspaper editor, Cameroon
 Hossein Derakhshan; blogger, Iran
 Bladimir Antuna (full name José Bladimir Antuna García); crime reporter, Mexico
 Tal Al-Mallouhi; blogger and poet, Syria
 Dilmurod Saidov; journalist, Uzbekistan

2009
 Lapiro De Mbanga; singer-songwriter, Cameroon
 Liu Xiaobo; dissident writer, China
 Maziar Bahari; journalist, editor, playwright and film-maker, Iran
 Miguel Ángel Gutiérrez Ávila; anthropologist, author and activist, Mexico
 Natalia Estemirova; journalist and human rights defender, Russia

2008
 Eynullah Fatullayev; journalist, Azerbaijan
 Melissa Rocío Patiño Hinostroza; student and poet, Peru
 Mohammad Sadiq Kaboudvand; journalist, Iran
 Tsering Woeser; writer and poet, China
 Writers, Cast and Crew of The Crocodile of Zambezi; Zimbabwe

2007
 Normando Hernanez Gonzalez; journalist, Cuba
 Jamshid Karimov; journalist, Ouzbekistan
 Fatou Jaw Manneh; journalist, Gambia
 Yaghoub Yadali; novelist, Iran
 Zargana Maung Thura; poet and comedian, Burma

2006
 Hrant Dink; newspaper editor, Turkey
 Wesenseged Gebrekidan; journalist, Ethiopia
 Lydia Cacho; writer, Mexico
 Yang Xiaoqing; internet journalist, China

2005
 Orhan Pamuk; writer, Turkey
 Shi Tao; poet and activist, China
 Dr. Roya Toloui; writer and women’s rights activist, Iran
 Paul Kamara; journalist, Sierra Leone
 Victor Rolando Arroyo; journalist, Cuba

2004
 Amir-Abbas Fakhravar; writer, Iran
 Rakhim Esenov; writer, Turkmenistan
 Guy-André Kieffer; journalist, Ivory Coast
 Roberto Javier Mora García, Francisco Ortiz Franco, and Francisco Arratia Saldierna; journalists, murdered in Mexico

See also
Reporters Without Borders

References

External links 
 International PEN
 PEN American Center
 PEN Canada
 English PEN
 http://www.echoworld.com/B07/B0711/B0711_PEN1.htm

Civil awareness days
November observances
International observances